Thomas Pridgin Teale FRS (1800 – 31 December 1867) was a British surgeon, elected a Fellow of the Royal Society on 5 June 1862.  His father Thomas Teale and his son Thomas Pridgin Teale were also surgeons.

He was one of the founders of the Leeds School of Medicine, and surgeon at Leeds General Infirmary from 1833 to 1864.

He was President of the Leeds Philosophical and Literary Society in 1861–63.

References

1800 births
1867 deaths
British surgeons
Fellows of the Royal Society